is a Japanese light novel writer and translator. Born in Kanagawa prefecture. He is from Keio University Fantasy Study Group. When he was a college student, he posted a coterie translation of an English tabletop RPG "TORG" supplement to Shinkigensha, which was publishing a translated version of this game at the time, and became a member of the translation team because of his ability. Since then, he has expanded his range of activities to translating American comics and writing novels.

Kaiho has had experience teaming up with Kazutaka Kodaka. While the original plot for the anime Danganronpa 3: The End of Hope's Peak High School was planned by Kodaka, Kaihō was in charge of revising the scripts to adapt them into the anime series. Kaihō was chosen by Lerche to write the anime based on his knowledge with the franchise. For Akudama Drive, Kaihō and Kodaka had multiple talks in the making of the anime's script and left it to director Tomohisa Taguchi to decide how to handle it once finishing it. In an Anime Trending poll, Kaihō won the "Best in Original Screenplay" award.

Work list

Novel
Enterbrain Famitsu Bunko
Valkyrie's Gambit Rinne Senki Zenoscape
Go beyond my corpse Cursed siblings' round dance
GUILTY GEAR X Silver Thunder
GUILTY GEAR X Butterfly and Gale
Growlanser Midnight Rainbow
Shikigami no Shiro O.V.E.R.S.ver 0.81
Shikigami no Shiro Gunsmoke Witch
Shikigami no Shiro II Sun Volume
Shikigami no Shiro II Yin no Maki
Shikigami no Shiro II Paradise Typhoon
Shikigami no Shiro III World Time Travelers
Jingai Makyo Fantastica of Nine
Jingai Makyo Riders of Darkness
Harvest Publishing / Minori Bunko
Goddess Ibunroku Devil Survivor Anthology Novel
Tadashi Oboromura ~ Princess Torigo and Pinky Swear ~
ASCII Media Works Dengeki Game Bunko
ROBOTICS; NOTES Unpublished notes of Misaki Senomiya

Drama CD
GUILTY GEAR X Drama CD VOL.1, VOL.2
GUILTY GEAR XX Drama CD SIDE: RED, BLACK
GUILTY GEAR XX Drama CD "Night of Nives Vol.1 ~ 3"

Manga 
Guilty Gear XTRA (Original draft, drawing: Shoji Kumai, "Monthly Magazine Z")
School-Live! (Original <Collaboration with Nitroplus>, Drawing: Sadoru Chiba, "Manga Time Kirara Forward" July 2012-January 2020)
School-Live! ~ News ~ (Original, Drawing: Sadoru Chiba, "Manga Time Kirara Forward" August 2020 issue-)
Labyrinth Detective Minato Lock (provisional) → If death also dies (Original <jointly with Hikaru Sakurai>, drawing: Komaku, cooperation: Monster *Lounge, "Monthly Dragon Age" December 2018 issue-, 2019 1 Renamed to monthly issue)
Deep Insanity (Original draft <jointly with Makoto Fukami>, drawing: Etorouji Shiono, "Monthly Big Gangan" 2020 vol.2-)

Game scenario
Jingai Makyo (in the name of Shiro Yato)
Home GUILTY GEAR X Story Mode
Home GUILTY GEAR XX Story Mode
GUILTY GEAR 2 OVERTURE Story mode

Anime
Series head writer is denoted in bold.

Gargantia on the Verdurous Planet (2013)
Gunslinger Stratos (2015)
School-Live! (2015)
Luck & Logic (2016)
Danganronpa 3: The End of Hope’s Peak High School (2016)
Kaiju Girls (2016): original draft and setting
Magical Girl Spec-Ops Asuka (2019)
Astra Lost in Space (2019)
Akudama Drive (2020)
Deep Insanity: The Lost Child (2020)
Giant Beasts of Ars (2023)

Live action TV
Kamen Rider Gaim (2014)

RPGs
Table talk RPG
BEAST BIND Demon Beast Bond R.P.G (in charge of the world view part. Main design is Junichi Inoue)

Translation
TORG (one of the translation teams, Shinkigensha)
X-Men (translated version released by Shogakukan Productions)
Watchmen (one of the translation teams, Shogakukan Productions)
Sandman (Interbooks)

References

External links
Official Twitter account

Japanese novelists
Living people
People from Kanagawa Prefecture
Keio University alumni
Year of birth missing (living people)